Signe Trosten (born March 30, 1970 in Tana) is a former Norwegian biathlete. She participated on the Norwegian team that received a bronze medal in team race in the 1991 Biathlon World Championships in Lahti. She also participated in Novosibirsk in the 1992 world championships, where the team finished 5th. She competed at the 1992 Winter Olympics in Albertville where her team finished 7th in the 3 x 7.5 km relay.

References

External links

1970 births
Living people
People from Tana, Norway
Norwegian female biathletes
Biathlon World Championships medalists
Sportspeople from Troms og Finnmark
20th-century Norwegian women